Dawid Smug (born 14 January 1994) is a Polish professional footballer who plays as a footballer who plays as a goalkeeper for Pogoń Siedlce.

Career

In 2011, Smug signed for Polish fourth division side Górnik Konin after training with Lech Poznań in the Polish top flight.

In 2012, he joined the youth academy of Inter, one of Italy's most successful clubs, but left due to a broken metatarsal despite being offered the chance to be sent on loan to the Italian third division.

Before the second half of 2014–15, Smug signed for Miedź Legnica in the Polish second division, where he made 26 league appearances and scored 0 goals.

In 2016, he signed for Polish top flight team Górnik Łęczna.

Before the 2018 season, Smug signed for Atlantas in Lithuania.

In 2020, he signed for Polish third division outfit Hutnik Kraków, where he saved 5 out of 9 penalties.

References

External links
 
 

Living people
1994 births
Polish footballers
Association football goalkeepers
People from Konin
I liga players
II liga players
III liga players
A Lyga players
FK Atlantas players
Miedź Legnica players
Górnik Łęczna players
Ruch Chorzów players
Hutnik Nowa Huta players
OKS Stomil Olsztyn players
MKP Pogoń Siedlce players
Polish expatriate footballers
Expatriate footballers in Italy
Polish expatriate sportspeople in Italy
Expatriate footballers in Lithuania
Polish expatriate sportspeople in Lithuania